Roland Mayr (born June 9, 1984) is a German professional ice hockey player. He is currently playing for ERC Ingolstadt in the Deutsche Eishockey Liga (DEL).

References

External links

1984 births
Living people
ERC Ingolstadt players
German ice hockey left wingers
Sportspeople from Augsburg